Redondo Hill Private Wildlife Refuge, is a protected area in Costa Rica, managed under the Central Pacific Conservation Area, it was created in 1997 by decree 26202-MINAE.

References 

Nature reserves in Costa Rica
Protected areas established in 1997